Glen Scott Shortliffe (November 12, 1937 – May 4, 2010) was a Canadian diplomat, civil servant, businessman, and Clerk of the Privy Council.

Biography 
Born in Edmonton, Alberta, he received a Bachelor of Arts degree from the University of Alberta in 1960.

From 1977 to 1979, he was the Canadian Ambassador to Indonesia.

From 1979 to 1982, he was the Vice President Policy for the Canadian International Development Agency. From 1982 to 1990, he held positions as Associate Secretary to the Cabinet, Deputy Minister of Transport, and Deputy Secretary to the Cabinet/Operations .

In 1990 he was appointed Associate Secretary to the Cabinet and Deputy Clerk of the Privy Council.

From 1992 to 1994, he was the Clerk of the Privy Council and Secretary to the Cabinet.

In 1994, he co-founded the Sussex Circle consulting group.

He died May 4, 2010 in Ottawa at home.

References 
 

1937 births
2010 deaths
Ambassadors of Canada to Indonesia
Businesspeople from Edmonton
Clerks of the Privy Council (Canada)
University of Alberta alumni